Clarence Edward Sutton is an author, entrepreneur, motivational speaker, and former NFL football player who played for the Appalachian State Mountaineers and the Chicago Bears. During his time with the Mountaineers, Sutton and his teammates became the first North Carolina Division 1 team to go undefeated. He is currently the founder and President of CTSHealth, a private agency that provides mental health, foster care, and adoption services to high-risk populations throughout North Carolina, South Carolina, Florida, and Illinois. Sutton is also the author of Why Not Me – From Survival to Significance, a biography that explores his early life growing up in inner city Chicago, and published his newest book, Is It Us?, in January 2023, a memoir of spiritual enlightenment.

Early life 

Sutton was born on December 29, 1972, and grew up in Austin, Chicago, the largest suburb of Chicago by both size and population. According to the Chicago Police Department, the area is known to have high rates of poverty, homicide, and violent crime.  While growing up, Sutton was frequently exposed to gang violence and criminal activity. However, he was able to find comfort and empowerment through athletics. He pursued football, baseball, and track at Austin Community Academy High School, and his success enabled him to leave Chicago to pursue a better future.

Football career 

Sutton first attended Triton College, a two-year community college, where he continued to play football. When the school's football program was eliminated, Sutton was recruited by several 4-year colleges, and ultimately selected Appalachian State University. At Appalachian, Sutton majored in Criminal Justice and played for the Appalachian State Mountaineers. 
 
In 1996, Sutton was signed by the Chicago Bears as a free agent, where he played until 1997.  While preparing to sign with the Kansas City Chiefs, he learned that he was at risk for long-term disabilities and nerve damage should he continue to play football. Sutton decided to walk away from the sport he loved and began to pursue other avenues.

Post-Athletic career 

After leaving his athletic career, Sutton worked for the Texas Juvenile Probation System in Beaumont, Texas, helping to guide and mentor at-risk children. In 1998, he and his family moved to Concord, North Carolina, where he enrolled in the local police academy. Upon graduation, Sutton became a law enforcement officer for the Concord City Police Department, and later a deputy sheriff for the Mecklenburg County Sheriff's Department. While he enjoyed the work, he found that he missed working with children and young people.

In 1999, Sutton began working with the North Carolina State Medicaid program, where he learned the ins-and-outs of the mental health field.  When North Carolina voted to divest itself from various public programs, Sutton decided to start his own private venture that would provide opportunities and resources to the state's underserved areas. In 2001, he founded Carolina Therapeutic Services, Inc. (CTS), formerly Greater Metrolina Mental Health Services. This private agency provides mental health services, foster care, and adoption to high-risk populations in North Carolina, South Carolina, and Illinois.

In 2014, Sutton formed CTS Community Development, a 501(c)3 non-profit that provides funding for school supplies, scholarships, holiday gifts, and more to low-income adults and children.

Works 
In January 2023, Sutton published a second book, Is It Us?   Having overcome the challenges of growing up on west side Chicago Clarence had fulfilled his dreams of becoming a professional football player, police officer, and businessman by his early thirties. He was surrounded by family and his business thrived across many states. He embraced all the trappings of success, new cars, travel, free to be whoever he wanted to be. When it all fell apart, Clarence disappeared. Follow his journey back from despair in this moving, authentic story of redemption.

Sutton published his first biography, Why Not Me – From Survival to Significance, in 2017. The book explores Sutton's early life in Chicago and his struggles to overcome the obstacles of inner city life and was written to be a source of strength, encouragement, and inspiration to young people facing similar challenges. Proceeds from the book's sales go to benefit various CTS Community Development programs.

References

External links 
 Carolina Therapeutics

21st-century American businesspeople
American male non-fiction writers
American non-fiction writers
Living people
Appalachian State Mountaineers football players
Players of American football from Chicago
Chicago Bears players
1972 births
People from Huntersville, North Carolina